Nothing but Death Remains is the first studio album by the Swedish death metal band Edge of Sanity, released by Black Mark Production on July 9, 1991. The album is dedicated to the memory of John Med Gummihandsken.

Track listing

Personnel
Edge of Sanity
 Dan Swanö – vocals, additional keyboards
 Benny Larsson – drums
 Andreas Axelsson – electric guitars
 Anders Lindberg – bass guitar
 Sami Nerberg – electric guitars

Production
 Gunnar Swanö – logo
 Gunnar Johansson – photography
 Micke Sjöblom – layout
 Dan Swanö – mixing
 Rex – mixing, engineering
 Lennart Lindberg – cover art
 Börje "Boss" Forsberg – mixing, producer

Edge of Sanity albums
1991 debut albums